The Grenchenberg (1,405 m) is a mountain of the Jura, located on the border between the Swiss cantons of Bern and Solothurn. The mountain is named after the town of Grenchen, located on its south side.

References

External links
Grenchenberg on Hikr

Mountains of the Jura
Mountains of Switzerland
Mountains of the canton of Bern
Mountains of the canton of Solothurn
One-thousanders of Switzerland
Bern–Solothurn border